The 2022 Kazakhstan First Division is the 28th edition of Kazakhstan First Division, the second level football competition in Kazakhstan.

Teams

Stadia and locations

Personnel and kits

Note: Flags indicate national team as has been defined under FIFA eligibility rules. Players and Managers may hold more than one non-FIFA nationality.

Foreign players

In bold: Players that have been capped for their national team.

Regular season

League table

Results by match played

Statistics

Scoring

Top scorers

References

External links
Professional Football League of Kazakhstan official website 

Kazakhstan First Division seasons
2
Kazakhstan
Kazakhstan